Stepped Up and Scratched is a remix album by British rock band Asking Alexandria. After many delayed scheduled releases, it was released on 21 November 2011 through Sumerian Records. It includes remixes done by Borgore, Sol Invicto, Celldweller, Big Chocolate, KC Blitz and more.

Borgore's remix of "The Final Episode (Let's Change the Channel)" was released as a digital single on 19 April 2011, as a promotional iTunes single back when the album was set for release in July 2011. Since then the album was again pushed back, and at some point believed to be shelved. In October 2011, it was announced that the album will be finally released on 21 November 2011, with Sumerian Records revealing the track list and cover art of the album. Tomba's remix of "Another Bottle Down" was released for free listening on Sumerian Records' YouTube channel, though it wasn't an official single.

The first official single from the album was announced to be Celldweller's remix of "A Lesson Never Learned" which was set for a 1 November 2011, release.
The Document One remix of "Reckless & Relentless" was premiered on Hot Topic's website on 10 November 2011.

Track listing

Personnel
Credits adapted from AllMusic.

Asking Alexandria
 Danny Worsnop – lead vocals, keyboards, programming
 Ben Bruce – lead guitar, backing vocals, keyboards, programming
 Cameron Liddell – rhythm guitar
 Sam Bettley – bass
 James Cassells – drums

Additional musicians
 Celldweller – additional production, remixing
 Tomba – additional production, remixing
 Document One – additional production, remixing
 Joe Buras and Lee McKinney of Born of Osiris – remixing
 KC Blitz – remixing
 Borgore – remixing
 Sol Invicto – remixing
 Eric "Bobo" Correa – remixing
 A.J. Cookson – remixing
 Robotsonics – remixing

 Bare – remixing
 Run DMT – remixing
 Noah D – remixing
 Big Chocolate – remixing
 Revaleso – remixing
 J. Rabbit – remixing
 Mecha – remixing

Additional personnel
 Joey Sturgis – production, engineering, mixing, mastering
 Amanda Fiore – executive production, A&R, booking
 Will Putney – mastering
 Ash Avildsen – booking
 Nick Walters – A&R
 Phill Mamula – cover photo
 George Vallee – publicity

Charts

Weekly charts

Year-end charts

References

2011 remix albums
Asking Alexandria albums
Sumerian Records albums